Yvonne Adelaide "Evie" Romain (née Warren; 17 February 1938) is a British former film and television actress of the late 1950s and 1960s.

Early career

Romain was born in London of Maltese descent and is a graduate of the Italia Conti Academy. From the age of twelve she appeared in children's shows and repertory. She started appearing in British films in her late teens. Her exotic, dark looks and 38-22-36 figure saw her often cast in supporting roles as Italian or Spanish maidens in war films and comedies. 

However, it is for her roles in numerous British horror films that she is perhaps most remembered. 

She enjoyed parts in Corridors of Blood (1958), where she starred alongside Boris Karloff and Christopher Lee, and also in Circus of Horrors (1960). She was also to star in the later Devil Doll (1964), about a malevolent ventriloquist's dummy.

However, Romain is probably best known for The Curse of the Werewolf (1961) where she starred with Oliver Reed in his first major role. In the film, Romain plays a mute servant girl who spurns the advances of the sadistic Marques. She is thrown into a prison cell with a deranged beggar who proceeds to rape her. As a result, she later gives birth on Christmas Day to future lycanthrope Leon (Reed), though the effort kills her. Hammer Films' publicity stills for the movie capitalised on Romain's obvious charms by having her photographed in typical 'scream queen' poses alongside a made-up Reed. This is despite the fact that she and Reed share no actual screen time. [Her name is misspelled on the trailer: Romaine instead of Romain]

Perhaps her biggest role was in another Hammer production, Captain Clegg (1962), aka Night Creatures (US title), playing alongside Peter Cushing and Oliver Reed again, this time as his fiancée. She also appeared alongside Sean Connery twice, in Action of the Tiger (1957), and the gangster film The Frightened City (1961), where she shared equal billing with the pre-Bond star. Romain also co-starred in the Danger Man episode titled Sabotage in 1961, and in the 1964 mystery film Smokescreen alongside Peter Vaughan.

Oliver Reed would be Romain's most frequent co-star, though. The two appeared together again in an episode of The Saint (Season 2, Episode 9 'The king of the beggars'), and for a fourth and final time in The Brigand of Kandahar (1965).
Yvonne, credited as 'Yvonne Warren', played the second sister in the episode 'Sir Bliant' in the TV series The Adventures of Sir Lancelot.

Later career
Soon after, Romain moved to Los Angeles and starred alongside Ann-Margret in The Swinger (1966), and Elvis Presley in Double Trouble (1967), which she herself calls a 'dreadful film', though she enjoyed the experience, being 29 then.

After a break from the screen, Romain emerged from semi-retirement as the title character in the Anthony Perkins/Stephen Sondheim-scripted mystery thriller The Last of Sheila (1973), her last screen role, she now being 37 years old.

Personal life
Known as Evie, she married Leslie Bricusse in 1958. He composed the musicals (including Stop the World I Want to Get Off, Scrooge, and Willy Wonka and the Chocolate Factory) and was also the lyricist for the classic James Bond themes Goldfinger and You Only Live Twice. 

She later turned down a seven-year contract with Federico Fellini because it meant working away from her Hollywood-based husband and young son Adam.

Filmography

References

External links

Yvonne Romain at HorrorStars
 Brief interview with Yvonne Romain
 Yvonne Romain Fans on MySpace
 Ultimate Yvonne Romain Yahoo Group

1938 births
Living people
English emigrants to the United States 
English people of Maltese descent 
Actresses from London 
English film actresses
English television actresses